Slam (stylized in all caps) is an American basketball magazine in circulation since 1994.

History
Slam was launched in 1994 as a basketball magazine that combined the sport with hip hop culture at a time when the genre was becoming increasingly popular. It was founded by publisher Dennis Page at Harris Publications, and he hired Cory Johnson to be the first Editor in Chief. Its first issue had a cover story on Larry Johnson of the Charlotte Hornets (written by future Fortune editor Andrew Serwer) and a feature on University of California freshman Jason Kidd. Many of the magazine's lasting features, such as In Your Face, Slam-a-da-month, and Last Shot all began with that first issue.

Slams ownership has changed several times. Peterson Publishing bought Slam in 1998. The next year, Peterson was acquired by British publisher EMAP. In 2001, EMAP sold its US division to Primedia. When Primedia left the magazine business in 2007, Source Interlink acquired a majority of the company, including Slam, In August 2017. Slam was then acquired by an investment group led by Dennis Page (Founder and Publisher) and David Schnur (Executive Publisher). The new holding company is Slam Media Inc. based in New York City.

The magazine carries advertising for basketball related products, street-wear clothing and hip hop music, and has been credited with helping to market hip hop culture and basketball as one.

Slam has published over 200 issues in its history, and has featured the biggest names in basketball on its cover, in articles, and on its famous SLAMups posters. To date, only two female athletes has ever appeared on the Slam cover – Chamique Holdsclaw in October 1998 and Maya Moore in the September/October 2018 issue. Kobe Bryant and LeBron James have appeared on a record seventeen covers.  "A Basketball On Fire" was the 1st Slam magazine cover without a player in February 2012.

The magazine is now available to international (non-US) NBA fans, with special editions printed in some territories (see below), and the addition of Slam to digital stores, such as iTunes (the remoteness/distance from the US of the subscriber has become a recurring theme in the letters section).

Writers and editors

Editors for Slam Magazine have included:
Cory Johnson (founding editor-in-chief)
Russ Bengtson
Darrylle T. Coston 
Anna Gebbie
Tony Gervino
Scoop Jackson 
Ben Osborne
"Old" Dave Lewis (first managing editor)
Dennis Page (publisher)
Susan Price
Khalid Saalam
Lang Whitaker
Ryan Jones
Sam Rubenstein (Online Editor)
Ryne Nelson
Matt Caputo
Tzvi Twersky
Abe Schwadron
Adam Figman

Other notable Slam writers have been:
 Tom Scharpling
 Darrylle T. Coston 
 Bethlehem Shoals
Davy Rothbart
Zack Burgess
Tonya Pendleton

Magazine features
 "Trash Talk": readers give their love to Slam or share some beef they had with the last magazine, and selected letters are put in this section.
 "SLAMADAMONTH": a short article describing a slam dunk accompanied by a photograph of the play. This feature usually features a dunk performed by an NBA player, but has featured college players in the past. The first SLAMADAMONTH (Spring 1994 issue) featured Chris Webber dunking on Charles Barkley.
"NOYZ": a series of one-line jokes commenting on recent basketball events, written anonymously. The first NOYZ column appeared in the March 1995 issue.
"In Your Face": 
"Last Shot": a former back-page column documenting a game-winning shot during a game. This feature was discontinued after the January 2000 issue.
"SLAM Magazine's top 75 NBA players of all time"—released in 2003.
"SLAM Magazine Old School"—Released in 2005.
"What's My Name?": SLAM fans make nicknames for NBA players and if they win they get a prize from the slam vault.
"The SLAM high school diary": In 1994, SLAM began a tradition of choosing a highly talented high school basketball player to keep a monthly diary recording their accomplishments as they moved toward playing college or professional basketball. Only LeBron James and Sebastian Telfair were not in their final ("senior") year of high school when they wrote the diary. The following players have been keepers of the SLAM diary: (current career status in brackets)

1995 – Stephon Marbury (NBA All-Star) and (CBA Champion)
1996 – Ronnie Fields (CBA Player)
1997 – Edmund Saunders (won an NCAA Championship with UConn in 1999)
1998 – Ray Young (CBA Player)
1999 – Mike Dunleavy, Jr. (NBA Player)
2000 – Andre Barrett (NBA Player) 
2001 – Eddy Curry (NBA Player)
2002 – LeBron James (NBA All-Star and NBA Champion)
2003 – Sebastian Telfair (NBA Player) 
2004 – Marvin Williams (NBA Player; won an NCAA Championship with UNC in 2005)
2005 – Eric Devendorf (NBL Player)
2006 – Thaddeus Young (NBA Player)
2007 – Kevin Love (NBA All-Star) 
2008 – Tyreke Evans (NBA Player)
2009 – Xavier Henry (NBA Player)
2010 – Harrison Barnes (NBA Player)
2011 – Quincy Miller (NBA Player)
2012 – Shabazz Muhammad (NBA Player)
2013 – Andrew and Aaron Harrison (NBA players)
2014 – Tyus Jones (NBA Player)
2015 – Malik Newman (NBA G League player)
2016 – Jayson Tatum (NBA Player)
2017 – Mohamed Bamba (NBA player)
2018 – Zion Williamson (NBA player)
Trash Talk: Readers' letters to the editor are posted here, with occasional comments by the editor.
Rookie Diary – The Rookie Diary is held by a new NBA rookie yearly, as they speak about their first experiences in the league: (rookie season team in brackets)
2002–03 – Drew Gooden (Memphis Grizzlies / Orlando Magic)
2003–04 – Carmelo Anthony (Denver Nuggets)
2004–05 – Andre Iguodala (Philadelphia 76ers)
2005–06 – Ike Diogu (Golden State Warriors)
2006–07 – Kyle Lowry (Memphis Grizzlies)
2007–08 – Joakim Noah (Chicago Bulls)
2008–09 – Eric Gordon (Los Angeles Clippers)
2009–10 – Jonny Flynn (Minnesota Timberwolves)
2010–11 – DeMarcus Cousins (Sacramento Kings)
2011–12 – Derrick Williams (Minnesota Timberwolves)
2012–13 – Bradley Beal (Washington Wizards)
2013–14 – Victor Oladipo (Orlando Magic)
2014–15 – Aaron Gordon (Orlando Magic)
2015–16 – D'Angelo Russell (Los Angeles Lakers)

SLAM cover athletes

Issue #1: Cover—Larry Johnson (May ’94)
Issue #2: Cover—Shawn Kemp (October ′94)
Issue# 3: Cover—Shaquille O'Neal (January ’95)
Issue #4: Cover—John Starks (March ’95)
Issue #5: Cover—Tim Hardaway & Latrell Sprewell (May ’95)
Issue #6: Cover—Michael Jordan (July ’95)
Issue #7: Cover—Grant Hill or Hakeem Olajuwon (September ’95)
Issue #8: Cover—Penny Hardaway & Michael Jordan (November ’95)
Issue #9: Cover—Allen Iverson or Charles O’Bannon (January ’96)
Issue #10: Cover—Scottie Pippen (March ’96)
Issue #11: Cover—Jerry Stackhouse or Damon Stoudamire or Magic Johnson (May ’96)
Issue #12: Cover—Michael Jordan (July ’96)
Issue #13: Cover—Alonzo Mourning (October ’96)
Issue #14: Cover—Shawn Kemp (December ’96)
Issue #15: Cover—’96–97 Rookie Class (February ’97)
Issue #16: Cover—Dennis Rodman (March ’97)
Issue #17: Cover—Grant Hill (April ’97)
Issue #18: Cover—Allen Iverson (June ’97)
Issue #19: Cover—Michael Jordan (August ’97)
Issue #20: Cover—Scottie Pippen (September ’97)
Issue #21: Cover—Kevin Garnett & Stephon Marbury (October ’97)
Issue #22: Cover—Rafer Alston (December ’97)
Issue #23: Cover—Chris Webber (January ’98)
Issue #24: Cover—Kobe Bryant (March ’98)
Issue #25: Cover—New Jersey Nets: Cassell, Gill, Kittles, Van Horn, Williams (April ’98)
Issue #26: Cover—Gary Payton (June ’98)
Issue #27: Cover—Michael Jordan (August ’98)
Issue #28: Cover—Michael Jordan (September ’98)
Issue #29: Cover—Chamique Holdsclaw (October ’98)
Issue #30: Cover—Penny Hardaway (December ’98)
Issue #31: Cover—Stephon Marbury (January ’99)
Issue #32: Cover—Allen Iverson (March ’99)
Issue #33: Cover—Michael Jordan or Reggie Miller (April ’99)
Issue #34: Cover—Shaquille O'Neal (June ’99)
Issue #35: Cover—Vince Carter or Paul Pierce or Jason Williams (August ’99)
Issue #36: Cover—Latrell Sprewell (September ’99)
Issue #37: Cover—Lamar Odom (October ’99)
Issue #38: Cover—Kevin Garnett (December ’99)
Issue #39: Cover—Kobe Bryant or Shareef Abdur-Rahim (January ’00)
Issue #40: Cover—Chris Webber & Jason Williams (March ’00)
Issue #41: Cover—Vince Carter (April ’00)
Issue #42: Cover—Allen Iverson or Jason Kidd (May ’00)
Issue #43: Cover—Shaquille O'Neal & Kobe Bryant (June ’00)
Issue #44: Cover—Steve Francis (August ’00)
Issue #45: Cover—Shaquille O'Neal (September ’00)
Issue #46: Cover—Tracy McGrady (November ’00)
Issue #47: Cover—Tim Duncan (December ’00)
Issue #48: Cover—Stephon Marbury (February ’01)
Issue #49: Cover—Rasheed Wallace or Jerry Stackhouse (March ’01)
Issue #50: Cover—Michael Jordan or Michael or Michael (April ’01)
Issue #51: Cover—Vince Carter (May ’01)
Issue #52: Cover—Alonzo Mourning (June ’01)
Issue #53: Cover—Chris Webber (August ’01)
Issue #54: Cover—Shaquille O'Neal (September ’01)
Issue #55: Cover—Allen Iverson (November ’01)
Issue #56: Cover—Michael Jordan (December ’01)
Issue #57: Cover—Los Angeles Clippers: Brand, Odom, Miles (February ’02)
Issue #58: Cover—Kevin Garnett (March ’02)
Issue #59: Cover—Baron Davis or Paul Pierce (April ’02)
Issue #60: Cover—New Jersey Nets (May ’02)
Issue #61: Cover—Dirk Nowitzki (June ’02)
Issue #62: Cover—Sebastian Telfair & LeBron James (August ’02)
Issue #63: Cover—Shaquille O'Neal (September '02)
Issue #64: Cover—Tracy McGrady (November ’02)
Issue #65: Cover—’02-03 Rookie Class (December ’02)
Issue #66: Cover—Kobe Bryant (February ’03)
Issue #67: Cover—Gary Payton (March ’03)
Issue #68: Cover—Allen Iverson (April ’03)
Issue #69: Cover—Yao Ming & Steve Francis (May ’03)
Issue #70: Cover—Jason Kidd or Chris Webber (June ’03)
Issue #71: Cover—LeBron James (August ’03)
Issue #72: Cover—Tim Duncan (September ’03)
Issue #73: Cover—Carmelo Anthony (November ’03)
Issue #74: Cover—Kobe Bryant (December '03)
Issue #75: Cover—Phoenix Suns or Detroit Pistons (February ’04)
Issue #76: Cover—Jermaine O'Neal or Karl Malone (March ’04)
Issue #77: Cover—Kevin Garnett or Allen Iverson or Shaquille O'Neal (April ’04)
Issue #78: Cover—LeBron James (May ’04)
Issue #79: Cover—Kenyon  (June ’04)
Issue #80: Cover—Class of 2004 High School Stars (August ’04)
Issue #81: Cover—Chauncey Billups (September ’04)
Issue #82: Cover—Shaquille O'Neal (November ’04)
Issue #83: Cover—Tracy McGrady or Steve Francis (December ’04)
Issue #84: Cover—Allen Iverson (February ’05)
Issue #85: Cover—Amare Stoudamire (March ’05)
Issue #86: Cover—LeBron James (April ’05)
Issue #87: Cover—Dwyane Wade or Ray Allen (May ’05)
Issue #88: Cover—Vince Carter (June ’05)
Issue #89: Cover—San Antonio Spurs or Ben Wallace (July ’05)
Issue #90: Cover—Ron Artest (August ’05)
Issue #91: Cover—Tim Duncan, Manu Ginóbili and Robert Horry (September ’05)
Issue #92: Cover—Steve Nash (November ’05)
Issue #93: Cover—LeBron James (December ’05)
Issue #94: Cover—Shaquille O'Neal & Dwyane Wade (February ’06)
Issue #95: Cover—Sebastian Telfair or Dwight Howard (March ’06)
Issue #96: Cover—Allen Iverson (April ’06)
Issue #97: Cover—Kobe Bryant (May ’06)
Issue #98: Cover—Chauncey Billups or Dirk Nowitzki (June ’06)
Issue #99: Cover—Greg Oden (July ’06)
Issue #100: Cover—Michael Jordan (August ’06)
Issue #101: Cover—Dwyane Wade (September ’06)
Issue #102: Cover—Gilbert Arenas or Chris Paul (November ’06)
Issue #103: Cover—Ben Wallace or Amare Stoudamire (December ’06)
Issue #104: Cover—Vince Carter or Chris Bosh (February ’07)
Issue #105: Cover—Carmelo Anthony (March ’07)
Issue #106: Cover—LeBron James (April ’07)
Issue #107: Cover—Allen Iverson (May ’07)
Issue #108: Cover—Phoenix Suns (June ’07)
Issue #109: Cover—Dirk Nowitzki or Shaquille O'Neal (July ’07)
Issue #110: Cover—Greg Oden & Kevin Durant (August ’07)
Issue #111: Cover—San Antonio Spurs (September ’07)
Issue #112: Cover—OJ Mayo (November ’07)
Issue #113: Cover—Kevin Garnett (December ’07)
Issue #114: Cover—Kobe Bryant (February ’08)
Issue #115: Cover—Carmelo Anthony & Allen Iverson (March ’08)
Issue #116: Cover—Three LeBrons (April ’08)
Issue #117: Cover—Michael Beasley or Eric Gordon or Derrick Rose (May ’08)
Issue #118: Cover—Dwight Howard (June ’08)
Issue #119: Cover—Boston Celtics (July ’08)
Issue #120: Cover—Chris Paul (August ’08)
Issue #121: Cover—Paul Pierce (September ’08)
Issue #122: Cover—Michael Beasley, Derrick Rose, and OJ Mayo (November ’08)
Issue #123: Cover—Kobe Bryant or Greg Oden or LeBron James or Dwyane Wade or Kevin Garnett (December ’08)
Issue #124: Cover—Deron Williams or Chris Paul (February 2009)
Issue #125: Cover—Allen Iverson (March 2009)
Issue #126: Cover—Kobe Bryant (April 2009)
Issue #127: Cover—Dwyane Wade (May 2009)
Issue #128: Cover—John Wall/Lance Stephenson or Ricky Rubio/Brandon Jennings (June 2009)
Issue #129: Cover—LeBron James vs. Kobe Bryant (July 2009)
Issue #130: Cover—Michael Jordan (August 2009)
Issue #131: Cover—Kobe Bryant (September 2009)
Issue #132: Cover—Carmelo Anthony (November 2009)
Issue #133: Cover—Shaquille O'Neal & LeBron James (15th Anniversary Issue, December 2009)
Issue #134: Cover—Dwight Howard or Kevin Garnett or Kevin Durant or The Lakers: Kobe Bryant, Pau Gasol and Andrew Bynum (February 2010)
Issue #135: Cover—Brandon Jennings (March 2010)
Issue #136: Cover—Kobe Bryant (April 2010)
Issue #137: Cover—Kentucky Wildcats: John Wall, Patrick Patterson, DeMarcus Cousins, Eric Bledsoe, and Coach John Calipari (May 2010)
Issue #138: Cover—Atlanta Hawks: Al Horford, Joe Johnson and Josh  or Oklahoma City Thunder: Jeff Green, Kevin Durant and Russell Westbrook (June 2010)
Issue #139: Cover—Michael Jordan (July 2010)
Issue #140: Cover—LeBron James or Dwyane Wade (August 2010)
Issue #141: Cover—Kobe Bryant (September 2010)
Issue #142: Cover—LeBron James or Dwight Howard (November 2010)
Issue #143: Cover—Derrick Rose (December 2010)
Issue #144: Cover—John Wall (February 2011)
Issue #145: Cover—Chris Paul or Rajon Rondo (March 2011)
Issue #146: Cover—Kobe Bryant (April 2011)
Issue #147: Cover—Blake Griffin or Amar’e Stoudemire (May 2011)
Issue #148: Cover—Miami Heat: LeBron James and Dwyane Wade or Carmelo Anthony or Derrick Rose or Los Angeles Lakers: Kobe Bryant and Lamar Odom (June 2011)
Issue #149: Cover—Anthony Davis, Michael Gilchrist, and Austin Rivers (July 2011)
Issue #150: Cover—Allen Iverson (August 2011)
Issue #151: Cover—Dirk Nowitzki (September 2011)
Issue #152: Cover—Derrick Rose (November 2011)
Issue #153: Cover—North Carolina Tar Heels: Harrison Barnes, Kendall Marshall, John Henson, Tyler Zeller, and Dexter Strickland (December 2011)
Issue #154: Cover—A basketball on fire (February 2012)
Issue #155: Cover—Kevin Durant (March 2012)
Issue #156: Cover—Blake Griffin and Chris Paul (April 2012)
Issue #157: Cover—Ricky Rubio and Kevin Love or Jeremy Lin (May 2012)
Issue #158: Cover—LeBron James & Dwyane Wade or Derrick Rose or Kevin Durant or Kobe Bryant (June 2012)
Issue #159: Cover—LeBron James (July 2012)
Issue #160: Cover—Anthony Davis (August 2012)
Issue #161: Cover—LeBron James (September 2012)
Issue #162: Cover—Carmelo Anthony (November 2012)
Issue #163: Cover—Dwight Howard (December 2012)
Issue #164: Cover—Dwyane Wade (February 2013)
Issue #165: Cover—Memphis Grizzlies: Marc Gasol, Rudy Gay, Zach Randolph, Tony Allen, and Mike Conley, Jr. (March 2013)
Issue #166: Cover—Blake Griffin or Russell Westbrook (April 2013)
Issue #167: Cover—Jabari Parker & Andrew Wiggins (May 2013)
Issue #168: Cover—LeBron James (June 2013)
Issue #169: Cover—Kyrie Irving (July 2013)
Issue #170: Cover—LeBron James or Kobe Bryant or Michael Jordan (August 2013)
Issue #171: Cover—LeBron James (September 2013)
Issue #172: Cover—Derrick Rose(November 2013)
Issue #173: Cover—Stephen Curry (December 2013)
Issue #174: Cover—Paul George (February 2014)
Issue #175: Cover—Kobe Bryant (March 2014)
Issue #176: Cover—Damian Lillard (April 2014)
Issue #177: Cover—Jabari Parker or Joel Embiid (May 2014)
Issue #178: Cover—Kevin Durant (June 2014)
Issue #179: Cover—LeBron James (July 2014)
Issue #180: Cover—Vince Carter (August 2014)
Issue #181: Cover—Kawhi Leonard or Anthony Davis (September 2014)
Issue #182: Cover—'14-15 Rookie Class (November 2014)
Issue #183: Cover—LeBron James (December 2014)
Issue #184: Cover—John Wall (February 2015)
Issue #185: Cover—Kyrie Irving (March 2015)
Issue #186: Cover—Stephen Curry or Damian Lillard (April 2015)
Issue #187: Cover—Kentucky Wildcats Men's Basketball Team (May 2015)
Issue #188: Cover—Houston Rockets: James Harden or Golden State Warriors: Stephen Curry and Klay Thompson or Atlanta Hawks: Jeff Teague (June 2015)
Issue #189: Cover—Andrew Wiggins (July 2015)
Issue #190: Cover—Kobe Bryant (August 2015)
Issue #191: Cover—Stephen Curry (September 2015)
Issue #192: Cover—LeBron James (November 2015)
Issue #193: Cover—Stephen Curry (December 2015)
Issue #194: Cover—James Harden (February 2016)
Issue #195: Cover—DeMarcus Cousins or Kristaps Porziņģis (March 2016)
Issue #196: Cover—Russell Westbrook (April 2016)
Issue #197: Cover—Kawhi Leonard or Jimmy Butler (May 2016)
Issue #198: Cover—Kyle Lowry, DeMar DeRozan and Drake (June 2016)
Issue #199: Cover—Ben Simmons (July 2016)
Issue #200: Cover—Michael Jordan or Allen Iverson (August 2016)
Issue #201: Cover—LeBron James (September 2016)
Issue #202: Cover—Karl-Anthony Towns (November 2016)
Issue #203: Cover—Kevin Durant & Stephen Curry (December 2016)
Issue #204: Cover—Steven Adams, Russell Westbrook and Victor Oladipo (February 2017)
Issue #205: Cover—Damian Lillard (March 2017)
Issue #206: Cover—Kyrie Irving (April 2017)
Issue #207: Cover—Joel Embiid (May 2017)
Issue #208: Cover—Isaiah Thomas (June 2017)
Issue #209: Cover—LeBron James or Stephen Curry (July 2017)
Issue #210: Cover—Zion Williamson (August 2017)
Issue #211: Cover—Lonzo, LiAngelo & LaMelo Ball or Stephen Curry & Kevin Durant (September 2017)
Issue #212: Cover—Markelle Fultz, Lonzo Ball, Josh Jackson, Dennis  Jr., Jayson Tatum & De'Aaron Fox or Michael Porter Jr. or Marvin Bagley III (November/December 2017)
Issue #213: Cover—Draymond Green or Devin Booker or CJ McCollum (January/February 2018)
Issue #214: Cover—Anthony Davis & DeMarcus Cousins or Trae Young (March/April 2018)
Issue #215: Cover—Donovan Mitchell or Klay Thompson or DeMar DeRozan (May/June 2018)
Issue #216: Cover—Deandre Ayton or Luka Dončić or Ben Simmons (July/August 2018)
Issue #217: Cover—Maya Moore or Cole Anthony or Andre Iguodala, Klay Thompson, Stephen Curry, Draymond Green & Kevin Durant (September/October 2018)
Issue #218: Cover—Jayson Tatum or RJ Barrett (November/December 2018)
Issue #219: Cover—Stephen Curry (January/February 2019)
Issue #220: Cover—LeBron James or Kemba Walker (March/April 2019)
Issue #221: Cover—Dwyane Wade or D'Angelo Russell or Kobe Bryant (May/June 2019)
Issue #222: Cover—Zion Williamson or Ja Morant or LaMelo Ball (July/August 2019)
Issue #223: Cover: Kawhi Leonard or A’Ja Wilson & Liz Cambage or Lou Williams (September/October 2019)
Issue #224: Cover: Zion Williamson, Jrue Holiday, Brandon Ingram & Lonzo Ball or Karl-Anthony Towns, Devin Booker & D'Angelo Russell (November/December 2019)
Issue #225: Cover: Bam Adebayo, Jimmy Butler & Tyler Herro or Trae Young or Jalen Green, Sharife Cooper & Josh Christopher (January/February 2020)
Issue #226: Cover: Paige Bueckers or Lou Williams, Montrezl Harrell & Patrick Beverley or Jayson Tatum, Kemba Walker, Marcus Smart, Jaylen Brown & Gordon Hayward (March/April 2020)
Issue #227: Cover: Ja Morant or Marc Gasol, Kyle Lowry, Serge Ibaka, Og, Anunoby, Pascal Siakam, Fred VanVleet & Norman Powell (May/June 2020)
Issue #228: Cover: Zion Williamson or Sue Bird or LeBron James, James Harden, Kawhi Leonard, Jayson Tatum, Joel Embiid, Giannis Antetokounmpo & Luka Dončić (September/October 2020)
Issue #229: Cover: LeBron James & Anthony Davis or Chris Paul or Breanna Stewart (November/December 2020)
Issue #230: Cover: Jamal Murray or Luka Dončić (February/March 2021)
Issue #231: Cover: Jalen Green, Emoni Bates or Sabrina Ionescu (April/May 2021)
Issue #232: Cover: Julius Randle & RJ Barrett, J. Cole or Skylar Diggins-Smith & Nneka Ogwumike & Sue Bird & Diana Taurasi (June/July 2021)
Issue #233: Cover: LeBron James, Bugs Bunny & Candace Parker & Anthony Edwards (August/September 2021)
Issue #234: Cover: Giannis Antetokounmpo & Betnijah Laney, Diamond Deshields, Arike Ogunbowale & Terrance Clarke (October/November 2021)
Issue #235: Cover: Donovan Mitchell & Azzi Fudd, Paige Bueckers & Paolo Banchero (December 2021/January 2022)
Issue #236: Cover: DeMar DeRozan, Zach LaVine & Kahleah Copper & Ye + Donda Academy (February 2022/March 2022)
Issue #237: Cover: LaMelo Ball & Dawn Staley, Zia Cooke, Destanni Henderson, Aliyah Boston (April 2022/May 2022)
Issue #238: Cover: Elena Delle Donne & Dillon Brooks, Ja Morant, Desmond Bane, Jaren Jackson Jr (June 2022/July 2022)

Most cover appearances
As of SLAM 228:
 LeBron James (27)
 Kobe Bryant (22)
 Allen Iverson (14)
 Michael Jordan (13)
 Shaquille O'Neal (11)

Most NBA team cover appearance
As of SLAM 228:
 Los Angeles Lakers (37)
 Chicago Bulls (25)
 Miami Heat (22)
 Cleveland Cavaliers (16)
 Philadelphia 76ers (16)
 Golden State Warriors (15)

Global editions
SLAM China
SLAM Magazine Philippines (launched in July 2011)

References

External links
SLAM Online

Sports magazines published in the United States
Ten times annually magazines
Basketball magazines
Magazines established in 1994
Magazines published in New York City